Salinas  is one of eight parishes (administrative divisions) in Castrillón, a municipality within the province and autonomous community of Asturias, in northern Spain.

The population is 4,635 (INE 2006).

Salinas is a seaside resort and is the second most populated municipality behind Piedras Blancas, which is located just 2 km away.

It has one of the longest beaches in Asturias, which is divided into 3 parts: Salinas, The Espartal and San Juan.

Salinas is visited by hundreds of tourists every year. Most of them come from Madrid, seeking a colder summer. Also during summer, it is easy to spot a local celebrity walking on the beach, such as the racing driver Fernando Alonso or the actress Bea.

Culture
The Philippe Cousteau Anchor Museum is located in Salinas on La Peñon peninsula near the Arnao tunnel.

References

Parishes in Castrillón